The Hungarian 44M "Buzogányvető" (English: Macethrower) was an unguided anti-tank rocket designed by Hungary for use against Soviet armour and personnel in World War II. The rocket system consisted of a pair of solid fuel rockets with two types of warheads available. It was regarded as one of the most effective anti-tank platforms used in WWII. Production started in spring of 1944 and ended 20 December 1944 when Soviet troops captured the WM Factory.

Development and operation
In 1942 the Hungarian Institute of Military Science (HTI) began work to develop an easy to produce weapon capable of counteracting heavy Soviet tanks and armour. Germany had started work on a wire-guided missile but was unwilling to share the technology with Hungary.

The 44M consisted of a launcher capable of holding two rockets with the gunner operating from weapon's left side. A tripod was developed for use by the three man crew on the ground, but this mount was difficult to maneuver and rocket crews often used captured Soviet wheel mounts from the PM M1910 or SG-43 Goryunov machine guns. The system was also mounted in the bed of the 38M Botond all-terrain truck and on the rear of the 38M Toldi II light tank.

The first of two types of rockets produced was a High-explosive anti-tank warhead (HEAT) round known as ’Buzogány’ (mace). With 4.2 kg of explosive, this shaped charge was capable of penetrating 300 mm of armour or concrete and destroy any type of heavy tank from a maximum distance of 1200 m. A high explosive (HE) projectile  round was also available for use in an anti-personnel role referred to as ’Zápor’ (rainfall, shower). Both types were spin-stabilized.

Of the 600-700 twin rocket launchers produced, the majority were used for the defense of Budapest in late December 1944, referred to as the Siege of Budapest.

See also
List of military rockets
List of anti-tank missiles
Anti-tank missile
Anti-tank warfare
Anti-tank gun
List of anti-tank guns

References

Weapons of Hungary
Anti-tank rockets
World War II infantry weapons